Raphetis is a genus of beetles in the family Carabidae, containing the following species:

 Raphetis curta Baehr, 2003
 Raphetis darlingtoni Moore, 1963
 Raphetis gracilis Moore, 1963

References

Psydrinae